Nestor Falls Airport  is located  north of Nestor Falls, Ontario, Canada.

See also
 Nestor Falls Water Aerodrome
 Nestor Falls/Sabaskong Bay Water Aerodrome

References

Registered aerodromes in Kenora District